Claudius Buchanan Grant (October 25, 1835 – February 28, 1921) was an American jurist, legislator, and lawyer.

Grant was born in Lebanon, Maine, on October 25, 1835, to Joseph Grant and Mary Merrill. He attended the University of Michigan from 1855 to 1859 and graduated with a Bachelor of Arts degree. He taught at Ann Arbor High School for three years, serving as principal the last two.

He served in the Union Army, in the 20th Michigan Infantry Regiment, rising to colonel during the American Civil War. He married Caroline Felch, daughter of the former governor of Michigan, Alpheus Felch, in 1863. He was admitted to the bar in 1866 and began practicing law with his father-in-law.

He was postmaster of Ann Arbor from 1867 to 1870, served in the Michigan House of Representatives from 1871 to 1875, and was elected to the Board of Regents of the University of Michigan from 1872 until 1880. 

Grant moved to Houghton, Michigan in 1873 and continued to practice law. He served as a Michigan circuit court judge from 1881 to 1889. From 1889 to 1909, Grant served on the Michigan Supreme Court and was chief justice. Grant died in St. Petersburg, Florida.

Notes

1835 births
1921 deaths
People from Lebanon, Maine
Politicians from Ann Arbor, Michigan
People from Houghton, Michigan
People of Michigan in the American Civil War
University of Michigan Law School alumni
Michigan state court judges
Chief Justices of the Michigan Supreme Court
Members of the Michigan House of Representatives
Regents of the University of Michigan
Michigan postmasters
Justices of the Michigan Supreme Court